Pedro Manuel de Urrea (1486 – 10 October 1535) was a Spanish Renaissance poet and playwright.

1486 births
1535 deaths
Spanish dramatists and playwrights
Spanish male dramatists and playwrights
Spanish poets
Spanish male poets